Barrack Hill is an area in Newport, Wales, in the suburb and electoral ward and coterminous community parish  of Allt-yr-yn. It is most well known for its canal paths and most prominently the Raglan Barracks which sits on the top of the hill. Raglan Barracks is used for army training and is where the Newport army cadets are situated.

References

Districts of Newport, Wales